Paul McNicholas (born 26 May 1975) is a former professional rugby league footballer who played in the 1990s and 2000s.

Background
Paul McNicholas was born in Sydney, Australia.

International honors
Paul McNicholas won three caps for Ireland in 2005–2006 while at Hull.

References

External links
Statistics at rugbyleagueproject.org
 Stats – PastPlayers – M at hullfc.com (archived by web.archive.org) 
 Statistics at hullfc.com (archived by web.archive.org) 

1975 births
Living people
Australian people of Irish descent
Australian rugby league players
Cronulla-Sutherland Sharks players
Hull F.C. players
Ireland national rugby league team players
North Queensland Cowboys players
Oldham R.L.F.C. players
Rugby articles needing expert attention
Rugby league players from Sydney
Rugby league props
Rugby league second-rows
South Sydney Rabbitohs players